Bay City Western High School (colloquially referred to as BCW or WHS) is a high school located at 500 Midland Road, Auburn, Michigan, and a part of Bay City Public Schools.  Its mascot is the Warrior, and its colors are brown and gold.  The school fight song consists of music from the march Winchester (from Winchester High School, Winchester, Virginia), with original words written for Western High.  The entrance roads to the school are Bryant Boulevard, named after the original principal, and Noell Way, named in honor of the school district administrator and head of the school board at the time.

History
Western High School opened its doors in September 1973 after two years of construction. It was built due to overcrowding at Bay City Central and T. L. Handy High School. During this time the students who lived in Bay City would go to school in the morning from 7:00 AM to 12:00 Noon; and those outside of the city would go in the afternoon, from 12:00 Noon through 5:00 PM.  In 1973, new boundaries were established, with mostly everyone west of Two Mile Road attending Western High School.  Seniors (and some juniors) were given the option to complete their education at Handy or Central. On the first day of school there were Handy kids on one side of the room and Central kids on the other side. By the end of the year they were all Western High Students.  When the building opened, construction on some parts of the facility had not yet been completed, including the main hallway, the swimming pool, the football stadium, and the commons.  There were student desks still in boxes in some parts of the building. In some cases students ate their lunches on top of carpet rolls in the commons that had not yet been installed.  It has been claimed that, after Handy High School was converted back to T.L Handy middle school (having been Handy High school since 1940) in 1990, two of its former students, now being forced to attend Western, went to their old school's parking lot and danced their own personal Homecoming, rather than attending Western's. At commencement that year former Handy students were permitted to wear their traditional red caps and gowns while Western students wore brown and gold.

In the 1980s it was announced that Western Middle School would be created and would share a building with Western High School.  To this day, Western Middle School occupies half of the building that was originally designed for the high school.  The two schools are able to operate simultaneously because of different schedules.  In addition, classrooms are physically separated into different areas of the building.  The two schools share the building's swimming pool, gymnasium, and commons.

In the 1980s, some portions of the school's tunnel systems collapsed due to water damage and was fixed with wooden beams and to prevent future damage.

Bay City Western has earned athletic state championships in 1999 in Michigan Division I Boys' Golf, and in 2013 and 2014 in Division 1 Baseball. In 2006 the Pompon team earned a state championship at the Highkick competition.

Building
Western High School has the usual number of academic departments. These include English, math, social studies, science, computers, arts, broadcasting and communications, human services, physical education and industrial arts, all of which are separated into wings.

There is a library in between the high school and middle school sides; they are connected as one room, but students are restricted from the other school's library.

There is also a second floor which consists mostly of math, human services, social studies, and computers as of which a middle school portion is connected in the east wing.

The lower portion of the first floor on the south side of school consists of science, social studies, and English.  The library entrance is also in this area as well as a locker bay. The south portion also consists of most of the classrooms in middle school.

Heading north are the administration offices which are halfway between the lower level and the second floor which leads to the main entrances, commons, gym on the west side. To the east are Bryant Auditorium and the Arts Department.

The Arts Department offers classes such as art, auto-mechanics, industrial drawing, welding, wood shop, video and radio, drama, choir and band. There is a backside and backstage entrance to Bryant Auditorium as well as a locker bay and entrances to the school's tunnel system.

Bryant Auditorium seats about 1200 people and is used for various activities including school plays and presentations. Beneath the stage is a rehearsal/dressing room and behind the stage contains the part of the Sound system and access stairs to the technical aspects of the lighting system. There is also a loading dock behind the stage. In the upper portion of the auditorium there is a lounge and spot light access.

The Commons is the area in which students of Western High and Middle school eat, although is separated into areas for them. It consists of a small vending area a corner store that students can buy school supplies and snacks from. There are also two lunch lines on each end of the common which are shared by the Western High and middle school students which sometimes can cause problems with shared lunch periods between the schools. A trophy case is in the hallway at the front of the commons. High school students have an open campus lunch due to the sharing of the commons with the middle school.

The upper and lower gym are located next to the commons as of which there are two entrances from the commons. Access to the locker rooms are also provided. Through the locker rooms there is a pool that can  be reached from other points in the building such as the "190's hallway" above the gym.

The pool area is connected to three separate rooms, and contains an emergency exit door. Of the three separate rooms, two are changing rooms (one for females, the other for males.) , and the other is a storage room. The pool ranges from 4 to 10.5 feet deep, and has 6 lanes. It is used for swimming tournaments and practice for the western swim team, and for the swim unit in their P.E. classes. The pool also has diving boards and blocks. There are bleachers for the students and/or athletes, or spectators watching the swim team.

The "190's hallway" consists of middle school and the economics class.  There are access points to the pool, gym, and school grounds in this hallway. The "190's hallway" has lockers against its walls and are used by high school and middle school students. Some students think the "190's hallway" can be used to skip classes due to its distance away from the main classes and little student traffic.  There is also a set of bathrooms that are always locked due to little traffic and vandalism.

The Bay City Western Football Stadium is commonly referred to as "The Cornfield" due to its close proximity to various farm fields around Auburn. The Bay City Western Marching Band also performs a "train" routine where they begin in concentric circles, and slowly rotate before speeding up and spreading out, while playing the sound of a moving train. This is due to a set of train tracks running directly behind the north end of the field that are visible from all around the stadium. It is believed that the most attended game at the stadium was between Bay City Western and Midland High on November 4, 2005, in a district championship playoff game, which Western won 35–21.

Grounds
The grounds consist of tennis courts, practice fields, baseball fields, and track surrounding the football field.  Also the student parking lot which is placed next to the baseball and football fields, there are also some old, unused basketball hoops in the center of the parking lot. There is a visitors and staff parking lot on the other side of the building which is not accessible through the student parking lot nor can students park in this lot. Sidewalks are surrounding the building guiding to Midland Road. The courtyard is located at the main entrance in which some students eat during lunch.

Demographics 
The demographic breakdown of the 1,256 students enrolled in 2015-16 was:

 Male – 53.5%
 Female – 46.4%
 Native American/Alaskan – .32%
 Asian – .80%
 Black – .48%
 Hispanic – 2.9%
 Native Hawaiian/Pacific Islander – 0%
 White – 93.6%
 Multiracial – 1.9%

23.2% of the students were eligible for free or reduced-cost lunch.

Notable alumni

 Betsy Brandt – actress
 Matt Costello – professional basketball player 
 Matt Mieske – professional baseball player
 Robert Rechsteiner a.k.a. Rick Steiner – professional wrestler
 Scott Rechsteiner a.k.a. Scott Steiner – professional wrestler

References

External links
Bay City Public Schools Homepage
Western High School Homepage

Public high schools in Michigan
Schools in Bay County, Michigan
Educational institutions established in 1973
1973 establishments in Michigan